The World Allround Speed Skating Championships for Men took place on 16 and 17 February 1985 in Hamar at the Hamar stadion ice rink.

Title holder was Oleg Bozhev from the USSR.

Classification

 * = Fall

Source:

References

World Allround Speed Skating Championships, 1985
1985 World Allround

Attribution
In Dutch